Factor investing is an investment approach that involves targeting quantifiable firm characteristics or “factors” that can explain differences in stock returns. Security characteristics that may be included in a factor-based approach include size, low-volatility, value, momentum, asset growth, profitability, leverage, term and cost of carry.

A factor-based investment strategy involves tilting investment portfolios towards and away from specific factors in an attempt to generate long-term investment returns in excess of benchmarks. The approach is quantitative and based on observable data, such as stock prices and financial information, rather than on opinion or speculation. Factor premiums are also documented in corporate bond markets and also across markets.

History
The earliest theory of factor investing originated with a research paper by Stephen A. Ross in 1976 on arbitrage pricing theory, which argued that security returns are best explained by multiple factors. Prior to this, the Capital Asset Pricing Model (CAPM), theorized by academics in the 1960s, held sway. CAPM held that there was one factor that was the driver of stock returns and that a stock's expected return is a function of its equity market risk or volatility, quantified as beta.

In the following decades, academic research has identified more factors that impact stock returns. For example, in 1981 a paper by Rolf Banz established a size premium in stocks: smaller company stocks outperform larger companies over long time periods, and had done so for at least the previous 40 years.

In 1993, Eugene F. Fama and Kenneth B. French published a seminal paper that demonstrated a value premium, or the fact that expected returns of value stocks were higher than for growth stocks. The roots of value investing date to decades earlier with the work of Benjamin Graham and David Dodd as outlined in their 1934 book Security Analysis, and their student Warren Buffett outlined their findings and application in his 1984 article "The Superinvestors of Graham-and-Doddsville".

In 1993, Sheridan Titman and Narasimhan Jegadeesh showed that there was a premium for investing in high momentum stocks. Other significant factors that have been identified are measures of corporate profitability, asset growth, volatility, external financing, leverage and research and development costs.

The value factor 
The earliest and most well-known factor is value, which can be defined primarily as change in the market valuation of earnings per share ("multiple expansion"), measured as the PE ratio. The opportunity to capitalize on the value factor arises from the fact that when stocks suffer weakness in their fundamentals, the market typically overreacts to it and values them extremely cheaply relative to their current earnings. A systematic quantitative value factor investing strategy therefore buys those stocks at their cheapest point and holds them until the market becomes less pessimistic about their prospects and re-values their earnings.

See also 
 Carhart four-factor model
 Fama–French three-factor model
 Low-volatility investing
 Momentum investing
 Value investing

References

External links 
Alternative Asset Management
London's Voices.com Attracts $18 Million US Investment

Investment
 Economics